These are the final results for the boxing competition at the 1972 Summer Olympics. The competition was held from 27 August to 10 September with the participation of 354 fighters from 80 countries.

Medal table

References

External links
 Results

 
1972 Summer Olympics events
1972
1972 in boxing